Bettina Müller-Weissina (born July 12, 1973) is a retired Austrian sprinter.

2004 Olympics
At the 2004 Olympics she reached the quarterfinals in the Women's 100 metres.

World Championships
She made three appearances at the IAAF World Indoor Championships - 2003, 2004, and 2008 - finishing as a semi-finalist each time.

European Championships
She competed in the 2002 European Athletics Championships and 2006 European Athletics Championships, but did not advance.  She advanced to the semi-finals and narrowly lost an opportunity to reach the finals of the 60 meters at the 2009 European Athletics Indoor Championships and also competed in the 2002 European Athletics Indoor Championships and the 2007 European Athletics Indoor Championships.

Military career
She was also a silver medalist in the 100 meters at the 2007 Military World Games.

She was also a silver medalist in the 100 meters at the 2009 World Military Track and Field Championships.

Doping allegations
In 2010, she came under doping suspicion.

References

External links

1973 births
Living people
Austrian female sprinters
Athletes (track and field) at the 2004 Summer Olympics
Olympic athletes of Austria
Olympic female sprinters